The women's high jump at the 1978 European Athletics Championships was held in Prague, then Czechoslovakia, at Stadion Evžena Rošického on 30 and 31 August 1978.

Medalists

Results

Final
31 August

Qualification
30 August

Participation
According to an unofficial count, 23 athletes from 15 countries participated in the event.

 (1)
 (3)
 (1)
 (3)
 (1)
 (2)
 (1)
 (1)
 (2)
 (1)
 (1)
 (1)
 (1)
 (3)
 (1)

References

High jump
High jump at the European Athletics Championships
1978 in women's athletics